Braeface is a village in Falkirk, Scotland.

External links

Canmore - Braeface site record

Villages in Falkirk (council area)